Poland competed at the 2012 Winter Youth Olympics in Innsbruck, Austria.

Alpine skiing

Boys

Girls

Biathlon

Boys 

Girls

Mixed

Cross country skiing

Boys

Girls

Sprint

Mixed

Luge

Boys

Girls

Team

Nordic combined 

Individual

Ski jumping

Boys

Girls

Team w/Nordic Combined

Speed skating

Boys

Girls

See also
Poland at the 2012 Summer Olympics

References

Winter Youth Olympics
Nations at the 2012 Winter Youth Olympics
Poland at the Youth Olympics